Janus (released internationally as Criminal Justice) is an Australian legal drama television series broadcast by the Australian Broadcasting Corporation from 1994 to 1995. It was created by Alison Nisselle and Tony McDonald.

It is a spin-off of the 1992 crime drama Phoenix, which also starred Simon Westaway as Sergeant Peter Faithful. The 1994 series was loosely based on the true story of Melbourne's Pettingill crime family and the Walsh Street police shootings. It was followed by a second series, Janus II, in 1995.

While the series struggled in ratings, attributed to its realism and complex legal jargon, it was critically lauded, winning several Logie Awards, including Most Outstanding Drama Series in 1995, and several AFI Award nominations.

Synopsis
Janus follows the bitterly fought prosecutions of a notorious criminal family, the Hennesseys, from the viewpoints of the family, the police and, in particular, the lawyers, prosecutors, barristers and judges, involved in all aspects of the story.

When the series begins, four members of the infamous Hennessey clan are acquitted of the shooting of two young policemen in a bungled bank heist. The city of Melbourne is shocked as brothers Mal and Steve, along with brother-in-law Darren Mack and friend Ken Hardy, walk free. The prosecutors, judges, magistrates and police – many modelled heavily on real-life legal figures – are determined to put the Hennessey members behind bars if they can. But corruption, legal loopholes, delays, and stretched resources combine to make the quest to jail the group far from straightforward.

Cast
Starring
 Chris Haywood as Defence Barrister Michael Kidd (25 episodes)
 Simon Westaway as Sergeant Peter "Noddy" Faithful (25 episodes)
 Jeremy Kewley as Crown Prosecutor Vic Manoulis (25 episodes)

Also starring
 Tracy Mann as Tina Bertram (12 episodes)
 Louise Siversen as Magistrate Glenda de Bono (18 episodes)
 Felix Nobis as Rob Griffin (23 episodes) 
 Jane Menelaus as Jenny Hanson (6 episodes)
 Paulene Terry-Beitz as Shirl Hennessey (21 episodes)
 Brett Swain as Mal Hennessey (16 episodes)
 Leon Teague as Steve Hennessey (13 episodes)
 Victoria Eagger as Rhonda Hennessey (8 episodes)
 Belinda McClory as Kirsty Nichols (13 episodes)
 Nique Needles as Darren Mack (7 episodes)

In addition, David Bradshaw and Jennifer Jarman-Walker reprise their roles from Phoenix as Andrew "Fluff" Saunders and Cath Darby respectively. Brett Swain and Belinda McClory previously appeared in Phoenix as other characters.

Episodes

Series overview

Janus (1994)

Janus II (1995)

Home release
The series was released in 2009 by the ABC on DVD in two volumes, each containing 13 episodes across 4 discs. However, it has since gone out of print.

Related shows
Members of the Pettingill crime family were later depicted in the 2008 first series of Underbelly and in the 2011 miniseries Killing Time. They also inspired the characters in the 2010 Australian film Animal Kingdom and the 2016 American adaptation of the same name.

References

External links
 
Janus at the National Film and Sound Archive

Australian Broadcasting Corporation original programming
Television shows set in Victoria (Australia)
1994 Australian television series debuts
1995 Australian television series endings
1990s Australian drama television series
1990s Australian crime television series